Price Morris (born 22 October 1941) is a Canadian weightlifter. He competed in the men's heavyweight event at the 1972 Summer Olympics.

References

1941 births
Living people
Canadian male weightlifters
Olympic weightlifters of Canada
Weightlifters at the 1972 Summer Olympics
People from Quinte West
Sportspeople from Ontario
Commonwealth Games medallists in weightlifting
Commonwealth Games bronze medallists for Canada
Weightlifters at the 1970 British Commonwealth Games
Pan American Games medalists in weightlifting
Pan American Games bronze medalists for Canada
Weightlifters at the 1971 Pan American Games
20th-century Canadian people
21st-century Canadian people
Medallists at the 1970 British Commonwealth Games